This article lists some of the events that took place in the Netherlands in 2011.

Incumbents
Monarch: Beatrix
Prime Minister: Mark Rutte

Events

January
 1: The BES-islands(Saba, Saint Eustatius and Bonaire) exchange their Antillean guilder for the American dollar.
5: In Moerdijk 23.500 liters of toxic and corrosive liquids escape during a large fire on the Chemie-Pack property. 
 8: Feyenoord says farewell to soccer legend Coen Moulijn. 
 11: A month after quitting as party chair of GreenLeft Femke Halsema leaves Congress.

February
 1: Air-defense and Command-frigate Hr. Ms. Tromp leaves her home port of Den Helder towards the waters around Somalia to take part in the anti-piracy mission Atalanta.
 11: Karlo Timmerman wins the alternative elfstedentocht on the Austrian Weissensee over a length of 200 kilometers. Mariska Huisman wins the woman's division. 
 28: 3 crew-members of a military helicopter are captured by Libyan militias. They flew with their Lynx of the Hr. Ms. Tromp to Sirte and landed there without permission.

March
 9: The Nederlandse Spoorwegen (Dutch Railways) are handed a record fine of 2 million euro due to not complying with performance agreements with the government.
 10-11: The 3 military crew-members are released during the night after intensive diplomatic discussions.

April
 9: Alphen aan den Rijn shopping mall shooting

May

June

July
 7: During the expansion of the Grolsch Veste an accident occurs with a lifting crane and makes part of the roof collapse. 2 people die and 14 others are injured. 
 15: Zendstation Smilde in Hoogersmilde partly collapses after a fire.

August

September

October
 2: The Nederlands Scheepvaartmuseum reopens her doors for visitors.
 31: An investigation into social-psychology papers uncovered massive amount of academic fraud at Dutch Universities. At least 30 papers by psychologist Diederik Stapel are found to have been faked.

November
 12: The national arrival of Sinterklaas takes place in Dordrecht this year.

December
 21: Astronaut André Kuipers starts his second space travel from the Baikonur Cosmodrome in Kazakhstan; he stays at the ISS for almost half a year. 
 29: Theater 't Speelhuis in Helmond is destroyed by a very large fire; the fire also damages several cube houses.

Elections
Dutch provincial elections, 2011

Sports
 February 4: Ellen van Dijk wins the 2011 Ladies Tour of Qatar, including the youth and points classifications.

See also
2011–12 Eredivisie
2010–11 Eerste Divisie
2011–12 KNVB Cup
2011 Johan Cruijff Schaal
2011 Baseball World Cup
Netherlands national football team 2011

See also
Netherlands in the Eurovision Song Contest 2011
Netherlands in the Junior Eurovision Song Contest 2011
List of Dutch Top 40 number-one singles of 2011
List of number-one albums of 2011 (Netherlands)
2011 in Dutch television

References

 
Years of the 21st century in the Netherlands
2010s in the Netherlands 
Netherlands